Mechteld ten Ham (died 25 July 1605) was an alleged Dutch witch in the city of 's-Heerenberg in the Dutch Republic.

Background 

The witch trial which condemned Ten Ham took place during a period of hardship for the city, which had suffered under plundering from Spanish troops and from the plague when the witch hysteria spread. People wanted someone they could blame, and Ten Ham was a person with different habits and a different personality. She made predictions about the future and about people's health.

Trial 
Ten Ham herself demanded to be put on trial; it was a custom to try an alleged witch by certain "ordeals", and Ten Ham was convinced that the trial would prove that she was innocent. One was the ordeal of weight. Another was the ordeal of water. The ordeal of weight was often easy to pass. She wrote to a known critic of witch trials, and thus refused to go through the ordeal of weight. When she was put on trial, however, her tactic proved a miscalculation. People accused her of making animals sick, spoiling crops and destroying marriages with magic. The authorities arrested her and tortured her until she confessed.

Execution 
She was found guilty of sorcery and sentenced to be burned alive at the stake. This sentence was carried out on 25 July 1605. The last witch trials to take place in the republic were the Roermond witch trial, where 64 people were burned to death for sorcery in 1613.

See also 
 Marigje Arriens

References

External links 
 

17th-century executions by the Netherlands
1605 deaths
Executed Dutch women
People executed by the Dutch Republic
People executed by the Netherlands by burning
People executed for witchcraft
People from Montferland
Year of birth unknown
Witch trials in the Netherlands